On , almost a year after Russia launched a full-scale invasion of Ukraine, Russian president Vladimir Putin delivered an address to the Federal Assembly, at Gostiny Dvor in Moscow, Russia.  This was the first Presidential Address to the Federal Assembly since the start of the invasion; Putin did not deliver such an address in 2022.

During the address, Putin asserted that the West had started the war, and that Russia had been using force to end it.  He stated that the Ukrainian people were hostages of the Ukrainian government.  Putin also said that the West had planned to turn a local conflict into a global one, and that the conflict represented an existential threat to Russia.  He added that it was impossible to defeat Russia, and vowed to continue fighting in Ukraine.  He also praised the people of Luhansk, Donetsk, Kherson, and Zaporizhzhia for the choice they made during the previous year's annexation referendums.  Near the end of his speech, Putin announced that Russia would be suspending its participation in the nuclear disarmament treaty New START.

Putin's address was simultaneously broadcast on television and in schools and government buildings, as well as displayed on large screens in public places in Russia and the occupied territories of Ukraine.  It was delivered a day after U.S. president Joe Biden had made a surprise visit to Kyiv, his first to Ukraine since the start of the invasion.  Biden also delivered a speech in Warsaw, Poland, hours after Putin had made his presidential address.  The following day, Putin made a brief appearance at a rally at Luzhniki Stadium in Moscow commemorating Defender of the Fatherland Day.



Gallery

See also 
 Address concerning the events in Ukraine, delivered by Putin a year before, to the day

Notes

References

External links 
 Transcript on en.kremlin.ru

2023 speeches
Events affected by the 2022 Russian invasion of Ukraine
Events in Moscow
February 2023 events in Russia
Speeches by Vladimir Putin

ru:Послание президента России Федеральному собранию (2023)